Route 37 is a highway in southwest Missouri.  Its northern terminus is at U.S. Route 160 in Golden City (it shares this terminus with Route 126); its southern terminus is at the Arkansas state line where it continues as Highway 37, though it only runs very briefly before ending at U.S. Route 62 in Gateway, Arkansas.

Route description
Route 37 begins as a continuation of Arkansas Highway 37 which starts about one half of a mile south of the state line in Gateway, Arkansas. It then passes through Seligman and intersects the southern terminus of Route 112. Route 37 then intersects Route 90 in Washburn and then enters Cassville, where it intersects Route 86 and the northern terminus of Route 112. From here, it produces a business route that goes through Downtown Cassville. Route 37 continues north all the way into Monet where it intersects US 60 before it turns west. The junction of US 60 is where Route 37 becomes part of the Trail of Tears Automobile Route going all the way down to the Arkansas state line.

Route 37 continues northwest, passing through Wentworth and Sarcoxie. It becomes concurrent with Interstate 44 Business as it heads west from Sarcoxie, also forming a wrong way concurrency until it interchanges Interstate 44. It then continues north, passing through Reeds and then Avilla, where it runs concurrent with Route 96. After leaving Avilla, Route 37 continues north and enters Golden City. It becomes concurrent with Route 126 before it reaches its northern terminus while Route 126 reaches its eastern terminus at the junction of US 160.

Major intersections

Route 37 Business

Official
 Cassville
 Seligman

Locally signed, not official

 Purdy
 Butterfield

References

037
Transportation in Barry County, Missouri
Transportation in Lawrence County, Missouri
Transportation in Jasper County, Missouri
Transportation in Barton County, Missouri